Botoko is a village in the Mbaki district of the Lobaye region in the Central African Republic.

Nearby towns and villages include Ndimbi (2.9 nm), Mboma (2.2 nm), Boubanzegue (1.0 nm), Karawa (7.6 nm), Bobangui (1.0 nm) and Mbi (2.8 nm).

References

External links
Satellite map at Maplandia.com

Populated places in Lobaye